Lochcarron is a village, community and civil parish in the Wester Ross area of Highland, Scotland.  It has a population of 923.

Locality
The name Lochcarron is also applied to the collection of small settlements strung out along Loch Carron, a sea loch on the west coast of Ross and Cromarty.  The village stretches for almost , meandering along the shore of the loch. It means "Loch of rough water". In the 19th Century the village was named Janetown, then Jeantown.   The local newspaper, An Carrannach, is published on a monthly basis.

Lochcarron is a central location for hillwalking and touring the West Coast Highlands, including the Torridon, Plockton and Skye regions. Close to the village lies the Bealach na Bà road (Gaelic: Pass of the cattle), which links Applecross to the rest of the mainland. It is a road popular with tourists, drivers, and motorcyclists alike for its scenery and hairpin bends.

Amenities
Lochcarron contains a variety of local services. These include two petrol stations, a Spar shop (which has a Post Office counter), a library, a nursing home (attached to which is the local library), medical centre and tartan weaving factory.

There are also two hotels (offering entertainment and meals), a restaurant and two cafés. The community hall hosts a number of public events including ceilidhs and sales; and sports such as indoor bowls and short tennis.

There are a number of self catering and bed and breakfast establishments, many of which are members of the local  business association.

Education
The local primary school stands at the entrance to the village, with 43 pupils (as of December 2019). The primary school offers both English and Gaelic Medium education. Plockton High School is the nearest secondary school to Lochcarron.

Employment
The area's biggest employment sectors include tourism, crofting, and fish farming. Other employers include transportation via sea and road, and quarry work. Service industries include engineering, motor garages, health services and education. The Howard Doris Centre employs people in the care sector.

Sport and recreation
Sailing is a popular activity amongst the local and visiting population, and as such, a local RYA accredited, and Volvo Championship Club hosts free sailing sessions every Wednesday evening (between April and October), and racing sessions every Sunday afternoon. It currently enlists over 100 members.

Lochcarron is home to the local shinty team Lochcarron Camanachd.  The team currently play their home games at Battery Park in the west end of the village. The playing field is used during the week for training, and knockabout sessions.

There is a 9-hole course in the area which is over 150 years old. The golf club's clubhouse offers catering facilities and golf clubs available to hire.

The nearby Attadale hosts an annual Highland Games every third Saturday of July.

Gallery

References

Populated places in Ross and Cromarty
Parishes in Ross and Cromarty